Dragana Kostova (born 2 January 1991) is a Macedonian footballer who plays as a defender for 1. liga club ŽFK Dragon 2014 and the Macedonia women's national team.

References

1991 births
Living people
Women's association football defenders
Macedonian women's footballers
North Macedonia women's international footballers
ŽFK Dragon 2014 players